Crimea Music Fest (Krym Music Fest) is an annual International Music Festival and International Song Contest, which takes place in Yalta (Crimea, Ukraine). The total prize fund of the contest is USD 200,000. The festival management is located in Kyiv.

Founders of the festival
Festival Art Director  is Alla Pugacheva, a singer. General Producer – Valentina Basovskaya, who has been working over Alla Pugachevas Ukrainian projects (musical "Chasing Two Hares" Pugachevas recitals in Ukraine, "Christmas Meeting" in Kyiv in 2009 and others) for a long time. The organizer of the festival is Krymfest LLC.

The first festival (2011)
Held from September 6 till September 10, 2011.

Representatives from 19 different countries of five continents (Eurasia, Africa, Australia, South America and North America) participated in competition program of the first festival. Participants age limit was from 18 till 30 years old inclusive. Each contestant presented two songs – the first performance was in the ethnic style representing national peculiarities of the contestants native country. The participants represented the world-famous hits during the second performance.
The jury chairperson of the contest is Sophia Rotaru, People's Artist of three countries (Ukraine, Russia, Moldova). Members of the International Jury: co-chairman Valery Leontiev (Russia), co-chairman Gloria Gaynor (USA), Alexander Bard (Sweden), Demis Roussos (Greece),  Erol Yaras (Turkey), Antero Payvalaynen (Finland).

Grand Prix of the festival and the first prize of USD100, 000 were awarded to Carolina Soto from Chile. The 2nd place won the participant Nikhil D'Souza (India), the third place jury awarded to the sisters Umara Sinhawansa and Umaria Sinhawansa(Sri Lanka). The Art Director of the festival Alla Pugacheva awarded "Alla`s star" to Rin'Go band (Kazakhstan).

The second festival (2012)
Scheduled from August 28 till September 1, 2012. The selection of contestants has been on since December 1, 2011.

References

External links
 Official site of the contest "Crimea Music Fest"
 News of the festival is on Alla Pugachevas official website
 Pugacheva did extravagated. "Moskovskiy Komsomolets", Moscow
 Pugachova switches on Crimean "Іntervision." "High Castle", Lviv
 Yalta Crimea Music Fest has been considered to be the most peaceful event in 2011 
 Details of the Song Contest
 History of the festival "Crimea Music Fest"»

Music festivals in Ukraine
Crimean culture
Yalta